Cristóbal Valenzuela is a Chilean-born technologist, software developer, and co-founder and CEO of RunwayML.

Education 
Valenzuela graduated from the Adolfo Ibáñez University (AIU), a research private university in Chile. From there, Valenzuela obtained a bachelor's degree in economics and business management, along with a master's degree in arts in design in 2012.

Career and recognition 
One of Valenzuela's first jobs as a teaching and research assistant at the Adolfo Ibáñez University School of Design, and later an Adjunct Professor in the same department. In 2018, he became a researcher at NYU's Tisch School of the Arts ITP program, where he worked with Daniel Shiffman. He has also worked for Idemax, and contributes to open-source software projects, including ml5js, an open-source machine learning software.

He co-founded RunwayML with two colleagues from ITP, Anastasis Germanidis and Alejandro Matamala. The goal of Runway is to democratize machine learning, making it a more egalitarian tool.

In recent years, Valenzuela's work has been sponsored by Google and the Processing Foundation and his projects have been exhibited throughout Latin America and the US, including the Santiago Museum of Contemporary Art, Lollapalooza, NYC Media Lab, New Latin Wave, Inter-American Development Bank, Stanford University and New York University. A current project sees him building an interactive documentary intended to illustrate the way machine learning connects with the human mind.

References 

Living people

Year of birth missing (living people)

Wikipedia Student Program
Adolfo Ibáñez University alumni
Applied machine learning
Chilean company founders